Akebia quinata, commonly known as chocolate vine, five-leaf chocolate vine, or five-leaf akebia, is a shrub that is native to Japan (known as ), China and Korea, commonly used as an ornamental / edible plant in the United States and Europe In its native habitat, it is often found on hills, in hedges, on trees, along forest edges and streams, and on mountainous slopes.

Description
The woody stems are greyish-brown with lenticels. The flowers are clustered in racemes and are chocolate-scented, with three or four sepals. The fruits are sausage-shaped pods which contain edible pulp. The gelatinous placentation contains seeds surrounded with white pulp, that has a sweet flavor.

Uses

Culinary 
The fruit contains a sweet soft pulp resembling a white Dragon fruit, eaten primarily in Japan as a seasonal delicacy. The rind, with a slight bitter taste, is used as vegetable, e.g., stuffed with ground meat and deep-fried.

Often eaten fresh, the Akebia fruit is best after it fully opens naturally on the vine. the seeds are very bitter and can even lead to throat irritation if chewed. They are discarded by means of "Spitting it out" or simply swallowing them whole. The fruit can be processed into jams, jellies, drinks and even added to smoothies or ice-creams.

Ornamental 
Akebia quinata is often grown as an ornamental plant in the United States, Canada, Europe and Asia. It is primarily used to cover less attractive spots on the sides of businesses or a ground cover to prevent erosion of hills. The flowers bloom generally in April - May and produce a "chocolatey" aroma which is often compared to vanilla or sometimes nutmeg rather than chocolate.

Various breeders of the plant have created new subspecies with their own unique colored flowers. One of these is the "Silver Bells" Akebia which has silvery white flowers with purple stamen. (see photo in Gallery)

Medicinal 
Akebia quinata consumption has been shown in-vitro to prevent obesity and reduce fat accumulation effectively as well as lower cholesterol levels present in the blood of rodents. Though not commonly known by the public because of the rarity of the fruit, this may be hailed as an "herbal medicine" for weight loss in the future. Akebia also has the ability to regulate chemicals in the kidneys, liver and cardiovascular system making it a health food if regularly consumed.

The stem contains approximately 30% potassium salts thus causing a diuretic action.

The fruit is used in traditional Chinese medicine to treat urinary tract infections, scanty lactation, and rheumatoid arthritis.

Other 
Traditionally the vines have been used for basket-weaving which may help reduce the spread of this plant in the Eastern United States.

The dried rinds have been used in Japanese fertility festivals and due to their "yonic" appearance it is thought to increase the fertility of women, although there is no scientific evidence to support these claims.

Cultivation

Akebia prefers sandy soils with good drainage, and regular watering, though it is drought resistant. In some areas the plant is an invasive species to be avoided. This species in considered hardy in all of the United Kingdom and Europe (down to -15 to -20 °C). In the US, it suitable for hardiness zones 4–9.

Akebia quinata, and all Akebia species for that matter, will not produce fruit if not pollinated by a genetically different plant. (E.g., male flowers from the mother plant or the male flowers from a clone of the mother plant will not be able to pollinate the female flowers.) Two separate varieties or two Akebia grown from separate seeds are needed to produce to sausage-like fruits

Etymology
Akebia comes from the Japanese vernacular name, akebi.

Quinata means 'divided into five' and is presumably a reference to its lobed leaves.

Distribution

Akebia range 
Akebia quinata can be found in North America from the border of Maine to as far south as Florida It is found in Australia, New Zealand, China, Japan, Korea, most of Europe and parts of Russia. This map represents the range found in the natural environment.  People may also grow this plant ornamentally in India, Indonesia,  Malaysia, South America and Africa.

Akebia in North America 
Akebia quinata is a minor invasive species in the majority of the East Coast and was introduced in 1845 as an ornamental plant.  This is because the plant has no natural predators or diseases in North America and can grow as it pleases. Its shade tolerance and ability to endure full sun allow it to adapt to nearly all conditions in is grown in. In the East Coast, Akebia quinata has been reported in, Florida, Georgia, Alabama, Louisiana, Tennessee, South Carolina, North Carolina, Missouri, Kentucky, Virginia, West Virginia, Ohio, Indiana, Illinois, Delaware, Maryland, Pennsylvania, New Jersey, Massachusetts, Vermont, Connecticut, Rhode Island, and as far north as Michigan and Wisconsin.

In the West Coast of the United States, Akebia quinata has not become a very invasive species. However, it has been reported in Washington State and Oregon.

Gallery

See also 
 Kampo herb list

References

External links 

 https://www.invasiveplantatlas.org/subject.html?sub=10090
 Akebia quinata (Houtt.) Dcne. (ITIS)
 Akebia quinata (Houtt.) Decne. Medicinal Plant Images Database (School of Chinese Medicine, Hong Kong Baptist University)  
 

Lardizabalaceae
Japanese fruit
Plants used in traditional Chinese medicine
Flora of China
Flora of the United States
Flora of Japan
Flora of Korea
Garden plants